James Haughton (5 May 1795 – 20 February 1873), nicknamed "Vegetable" Haughton, was an Irish social reformer, temperance activist and vegetarian.

Life
Haughton, son of Samuel Pearson Haughton (1748–1828), by Mary, daughter of James Pim of Rushin, Queen's County (now County Laois), Ireland, was born in Carlow and educated at Ballitor, County Kildare, from 1807 to 1810, under James White, a quaker. After filling several situations to learn his business, in 1817 he settled in Dublin, where he became a corn and flour factor, in partnership with his brother William. He retired in 1850. Although educated as a Friend, he joined the Unitarians in 1834, and remained throughout his life a strong believer in their tenets.

He supported the anti-slavery movement at an early period and took an active part in it until 1838, going in that year to London as a delegate to a convention. Shortly after the Temperance campaigner, Father Mathew, took the pledge, 10 April 1838, Haughton became one of his most devoted disciples. For many years he gave most of his time and energies to promoting total abstinence and to advocating legislative restrictions on the sale of intoxicating drinks.

In December 1844 he was the chief promoter of a fund which was raised to pay some of the debts of Father Mathew and release him from prison. About 1835 he commenced a series of letters in the public press which made his name widely known. He wrote on temperance, slavery, British India, peace, capital punishment, sanitary reform, and education. His first letters were signed ‘The Son of a Water Drinker,’ but he soon commenced using his own name and continued to write till 1872. He took a leading part in a series of weekly meetings which were held in Dublin in 1840, when so numerous were the social questions discussed that a newspaper editor called the speakers the "Anti-everythingarians". In association with Daniel O'Connell, of whose character he had a very high opinion, he advocated various plans for the amelioration of the condition of Ireland and the Repeal of the Union, but was always opposed to physical force. 

When in July 1846 O'Connell son John forced a division the increasingly impatient "Young Irelanders" within his father's Repeal Association by tabling resolutions that repudiated political violence under circumstances, Haughton sought to mediate. In a decision perhaps made easier by Daniel O'Connell's death in May 1847, he ultimately sided with the dissidents:  Thomas Meagher argued that the Young Irelanders were not advocating physical force, but might regard a resort to arms as "a no less honourable course" if Repeal could not be carried by moral persuasion. Haughton, however, resigned in turn from the new Irish Confederation in protest against a letter of thanks to US Vice-President George Mifflin Dallas which had failed to note and condemn Dallas's ownership of slaves.

Haughton was one of the first members of the Statistical Society of Dublin, 1847, a founder of the Dublin Mechanics' Institute, 1849, in the same year was on the committee of the Dublin Peace Society, aided in abolishing Donnybrook Fair 1855, and took a chief part in 1861 in opening the Botanic Gardens at Glasnevin on Sundays.

He died at 35 Eccles Street, Dublin, on 20 Feb. 1873, and was buried in Mount Jerome Cemetery 24 Feb. in the presence of an immense crowd of people.

His son, Samuel Haughton published a memoir of his father's life including extracts from his public correspondence in 1877.  The scientist Samuel Haughton was a half nephew of James Haughton.  The scientist was the second son of yet another Samuel Haughton (1786-1874), who in turn was the son of Samuel Pearson Haughton and his second wife, Jane Boake.

Vegetarianism

Haughton became a vegetarian in 1846, both on moral and sanitary grounds. For two or three years before his death he was president of the Vegetarian Society of the United Kingdom.

Publications

 Slavery Immoral, 1847
 A Memoir of Thomas Clarkson, 1847
 
 A Plea for Teetotalism and the Maine Liquor Law, 1855

References

Attribution

1795 births
1873 deaths
Burials at Mount Jerome Cemetery and Crematorium
Irish temperance activists
Irish Unitarians
Irish vegetarianism activists
People associated with the Vegetarian Society
People from County Carlow
Social reformers